

Winners
Best Actor
Winner: John Thaw — Inspector Morse (ITV)
Other nominees: Joss Ackland — First And Last; John Gielgud — Summer's Lease; Alfred Molina — The Accountant
Best Actress
Winner: Diana Rigg — Mother Love
Other nominees: Peggy Ashcroft — She's Been Away; Judi Dench — Behaving Badly; Gwen Taylor — A Bit of a Do
Best Comedy (Programme or Series)
Winner: Blackadder Goes Forth
Other nominees: After Henry; The New Statesman; Only Fools And Horses
Best Light Entertainment Performance
Winner: Rowan Atkinson — Blackadder Goes Forth
Other nominees: Barry Humphries — The Dame Edna Experience ; David Jason — Only Fools And Horses; Victoria Wood — Victoria Wood
Best Drama Series
Winner: Traffik
Other nominees: Inspector Morse (ITV); Mother Love; Summer's Lease
Best Single Drama
Winner: The Accountant
Other nominees: Bomber Harris; First And Last; She's Been Away
Best News Coverage
Winner: BBC News — Square Massacre
Other nominees: BBC Berlin Wall Coverage; BBC Nine O'Clock News — Kate Adie Secret Report from Chinese Hospital; ITN Coverage of Romania
Best Factual Series
Winner: Forty Minutes
Other nominees: Arena (BBC / BBC2); Around the World in 80 Days; World in Action
Flaherty Award for Single Documentary
Winner: First Tuesday — Four Hours In My Lai 
Other nominees: Everyman: Romania — State of Fear; Lost Children of The Empire; Viewpoint '89: Cambodia — Year 10: A Special Report by John Pilger
Huw Wheldon Award for Arts Programme or Series
Winner: Omnibus: Art In The Third Reich
Other nominees: Arena — Tales From Barcelona (BBC / BBC2); The South Bank Show — Barry Humphries; The South Bank Show — Dustin Hoffman
Light Entertainment Programme or Series
Winner: Clive James On The '80s
Other nominees: The Dame Edna Experience; Victoria Wood; Whose Line Is It Anyway?
Best Children's Educational Documentary Programme
Winner: The Really Wild Show
Other nominees: Blockbusters; Choices: Who'd Be a Woman; Scene: My Brother David
Best Children's Entertainment / Drama Programme
Winner: Maid Marian and her Merry Men
Other nominees: The BFG; The Chronicles Of Narnia; Woof
Foreign Programme Award
Hotel Terminus
BAFTA Fellowship Award
Paul Fox, CBE

External links
Archive of winners on official BAFTA website (retrieved 4 June 2013).
British Academy Television Awards 1996  at the Internet Movie Database

1990
1990 television awards
1990 awards in the United Kingdom
1990 in British television